Sancha of Aragon (1478 in Gaeta – 1506 in Naples), or Sancia of Aragon, was an illegitimate daughter of King Alfonso II of Naples and his mistress Trogia Gazzella. In 1494, she was married to Gioffre Borgia, youngest son of Pope Alexander VI. Upon her marriage, she and her husband were created Prince and Princess of Squillace, a province in the south of Italy. For the majority of their marriage, Sancha and her husband lived in the Vatican with the rest of his family. There Sancha became friends with her sister-in-law Lucrezia, and allegedly had affairs with both of her husband's older brothers: Juan Borgia, 2nd Duke of Gandia, also known as Giovanni Borgia, and Cesare Borgia. Her affair with Juan is sometimes said to be the reason for Cesare's alleged murder of Juan in 1497.

Sancha's brother, Alfonso of Aragon, married Lucrezia Borgia. Sancha's life among the Borgias became a turbulent one after Cesare made an advantageous marriage with a French princess, Charlotte d'Albret, in order to secure French support for his military campaigns. This put Cesare's interests in direct conflict with those of the Italian states. Sancha's home city of Naples was no exception, and it had long been nervous about militant French interests.

It is rumored that Alfonso was brutally murdered in 1500 by Cesare, due to interests with France against Naples.  Sancha, now a political embarrassment, was imprisoned in the Castel Sant'Angelo in Rome until the death of Pope Alexander in 1503. Upon his death, she managed to regain her freedom and returned to Naples with her young nephew, Rodrigo, whom she raised as her own. She never lived with her husband, Gioffre, again. Cesare visited her not long after and asked if she would take on the care of Giovanni "The Roman Infant", possibly Lucrezia's illegitimate child, but probably the illegitimate child of Pope Alexander VI, which she agreed to do. She died of an undisclosed illness in 1506, a year before Cesare's own death.

In popular culture
 In the 1981 mini-series The Borgias, Sancia was played by Eleanor David. In this adaptation, her adulterous affairs are focused solely on Juan, although she does say that she not only has affairs with his brother Cesare, but their father Rodrigo as well.
 In the 2006 Spanish film Los Borgias, Sancia was played by actress Linda Batista.
 In the 2011 Showtime original series The Borgias, Sancia is played by actress Emmanuelle Chriqui. However, the show depicts her as already being ennobled with the title of Duchess of Squillace prior to her marriage to Joffre Borgia. She only has affairs with Juan.
 In the 2011 Canal + original series Borgia, Sancia is played by Czech actress Eliška Křenková. She is depicted as becoming pregnant with Juan Borgia's child after having an affair with him on the night of her marriage to Goffredo, although in real life she never had children. In the second season, she tries to seduce Cesare, while suggesting that she has Goffredo annul their marriage so that Cesare can be married to her while Goffredo takes Cesare's place as a cardinal, and then she and Cesare would kill her cousin Carlotta d'Aragona (whom Cesare was infatuated with and was pursuing for hopes of marrying her instead of Guy de Laval), and then they would become king and queen of Naples, but Cesare rebuffs her and uses a red hot cross shaped iron to burn a scar on her forehead.
 The 2005 Jeanne Kalogridis novel The Borgia Bride is told from Sancia's point of view, except for her death, mentioned in an Afterword.

References

 

1478 births
1506 deaths
House of Trastámara
15th-century Neapolitan people
House of Borgia
Italian princesses
Illegitimate children of Neapolitan monarchs
16th-century Neapolitan people
15th-century Italian women
15th-century Italian nobility
Daughters of kings